The Samsung Lions are a South Korean professional baseball team founded in 1982. They are based in the southeastern city of Daegu and are members of the KBO League. Their home stadium is Daegu Samsung Lions Park. They have won the Korean Championship eight times, and also finished as runners-up on ten occasions. The Samsung Lions are the first team to win four consecutive Korean Series titles (2011, 2012, 2013, 2014), and are also the first team to win the regular season league title for five consecutive years (2011, 2012, 2013, 2014, 2015).

History
The Samsung Lions were founded in 1982 as one of the original six KBO League teams. They won their first championship in 1985, going 40-14-1 in the first half and 37-18 in the second half for a total of 77–32 for the best one-season winning percentage in KBO League history (a record that still stands). The 1985 team had two 25-game-winners on their staff, Kim Si-jin and Kim ll-young; as the Lions were winners of both half-season pennants that year, no Korean Series was held and the Lions were declared champions outright. 

The Lions would also win the championship in 2002, 2005 and 2006, having the best record in each one of those years. In 2010, Ryu Jung-il was hired as the new manager of the Samsung Lions. He led the team to the best record in the league and its fifth KBO title in 2011. After the KBO League, the Samsung Lions won the Asian Series championship. The Samsung Lions became the first team to win the pennant race, the Korean Series, and the Asian Series in the same year.

In 2012, one of the most notable players on the team, Lee Seung-yuop, returned to South Korea from Japan. With his help, the Samsung Lions won their sixth championship in the 2012 season. They won another two championships in 2013 and 2014, for a total of eight Korean Series championships. In 2016, Samsung Lions moved to their new stadium, Daegu Samsung Lions Park.

Season-by-season records

Team

Current roster

Korean Baseball League MVP 
 1983: Lee Man-soo (catcher)
 1987: Jang Hyo-jo (outfielder)
 1993: Kim Seong-rae (infielder)
 1997, 1999, 2001, 2002, 2003: Lee Seung-yuop (infielder)
 2004: Bae Young-soo (pitcher)

Player Records (batter)

Batting average 
 1983 Jang Hyo-jo AVG .369
 1984 Lee Man-soo AVG .340
 1985 Jang Hyo-jo AVG .373
 1986 Jang Hyo-jo AVG .329
 1987 Jang Hyo-jo AVG .387
 1993 Yang Joon-hyuk AVG .341
 1996 Yang Joon-hyuk AVG .346
 1998 Yang Joon-hyuk AVG .342

Home runs 
 1983 Lee Man-soo 27 HR
 1984 Lee Man-soo 23 HR
 1985 Lee Man-soo 22 HR
 1987 Kim Seong-rae 22 HR
 1993 Kim Seong-rae 28 HR
 1997 Lee Seung-yuop 32 HR
 1999 Lee Seung-yuop 54 HR
 2001 Lee Seung-yuop 39 HR
 2002 Lee Seung-yuop 47 HR
 2003 Lee Seung-yuop 56 HR
 2007 Shim Jeong-soo 31 HR
 2011 Choi Hyoung-woo 30 HR

Retired numbers 
The first number retired by the Samsung Lions organization was number 22, in honour of catcher and slugger Lee Man-soo, who played for the team from 1982 to 1997, and was later a coach with the Chicago White Sox of the MLB and the SK Wyverns. Lee was a five-time KBO League Golden Glove Award-winner with the Lions, won the KBO League MVP in 1983, and the hitting Triple Crown in 1984. The second number retired by the Samsung Lions organization was number 10, in honour of left-handed batter Yang Joon-hyuk, who played for the team from 1993 to 1998 and from 2002 to 2010. Yang led the league in batting four times, and holds six career batting records (including at one time the home run record with 351, now surpassed by Lee Seung-yeop). The third retired number, 36, was retired in honour of Lee Seung-yuop, who has spent 15 seasons with the club and is the all-time KBO League leader in home runs with 467. Lee also holds the KBO records for runs scored, RBIs, total bases, slugging percentage, and OPS.

Managers
Seo Young-moo (1982–1983)
Lee Chung-nam (1983)
Kim Yeong-duk (1984–1986)
Jeong Dong-jin (1986) (caretaker)
Park Young-gil (1987–1988)
Jeong Dong-jin (1989–1990)
Kim Sung-keun (1991–1992)
Woo Yong-deuk (1993–1995)
Baek In-chun (1996–1997)
Cho Chang-soo (1997) (caretaker)
Seo Jeong-hwan (1998–1999)
Kim Yong-hee (2000)
Kim Eung-ryong (2001–2004)
Sun Dong-yol (2005–2010)
Ryu Joong-il (2011–2016)
Kim Han-soo (2017–2019)
Heo Sam-young (2020–2022)
Park Jin-man (2022–present)

References
General

Specific

External links

 Official website 

 
KBO League teams
Baseball teams established in 1982
Sport in Daegu
Baseball
Cheil Worldwide
1982 establishments in South Korea